Gustave Marinius Heiss (November 4, 1904 – June 7, 1982) was a United States fencing champion and winner of a bronze medal in team épée fencing at the 1932 Summer Olympics in Los Angeles. He also competed at the 1936 Summer Olympics in Berlin, where the American team placed fifth.  He was a four-time U.S. National Épée Champion (1933, 1934, 1936, and 1941).

Fencing career
Heiss was born in Meridian, Mississippi. After briefly attending Tulane University, he entered the United States Military Academy at West Point.

Heiss competed in épée, individually and on a team, and won the following titles:

1931  IFA Individual Épée Champion (USMA) 
1932  Outdoor U.S. National Épée Champion
1932  U.S. National Épée Team Champion (NYFC)
1933  U.S. National Épée Team Champion (NYFC)
1933  U.S. National Épée Champion
1934  U.S. National Épée Team Champion (NYFC)
1934  U.S. National Épée Champion
1935  U.S. National Épée Team Champion (NYFC)
1936  U.S. National Épée Team Champion (NYFC)
1936  U.S. National Épée Champion
1939  U.S. National Épée Team Champion (NYFC)
1940  Outdoor U.S. National Épée Champion
1941  U.S. National Épée Team Champion (NYFC)
1941  U.S. National Épée Champion

1932  U.S. Olympic Team, Men's Épée - Bronze medal
1936  U.S. Olympic Team, Men's Épée - 5th place

Army career
During World War II, Heiss was severely wounded while commanding a battalion in the 87th Infantry Division at the Battle of the Bulge (December 1944). He received the Bronze Star, the Silver Star, and the Purple Heart.

Post World War II career
After World War II, Heiss lived in Arlington, Virginia. From 1947 to 1955 he worked as chief of vocational rehabilitation and education at the Veterans Administration. He then worked at the National Security Agency from 1955 to 1958. Marriages to Virginia Jones Heiss and Hertha Wegener Heiss ended in divorce. He had one son from his first marriage and two daughters from his second.

Heiss was elected to the U.S. Fencing Hall of Fame.

He was buried at West Point.

References

External links
 
 

1904 births
1982 deaths
American male épée fencers
Olympic bronze medalists for the United States in fencing
Fencers at the 1932 Summer Olympics
Fencers at the 1936 Summer Olympics
Medalists at the 1932 Summer Olympics
Tulane University alumni
United States Military Academy alumni
Recipients of the Silver Star
Sportspeople from Meridian, Mississippi
Sportspeople from New York (state)
Sportspeople from Virginia